Siniscola is a comune (municipality) in the province of Nuoro in the Italian region Sardinia, located about  northeast of Cagliari and about  northeast of Nuoro. 
Siniscola borders the following municipalities: Irgoli, Lodè, Lula, Onifai, Orosei, Posada, Torpè.

References

Cities and towns in Sardinia